The 2000–01 NBA season was the Bulls' 35th season in the National Basketball Association. In the 2000 NBA draft, the Bulls selected Marcus Fizer from Iowa State with the fourth overall pick, and selected Chris Mihm from the University of Texas at Austin with the seventh pick, but soon traded Mihm to the Cleveland Cavaliers in exchange for top draft pick Jamal Crawford. During the off-season, the team signed free agents Ron Mercer, and Brad Miller. The Bulls continued to struggle losing 24 of their first 27 games, then later holding a 6–42 record at the All-Star break, as they finished with 15 wins and 67 losses, the worst record in the Central Division and the worst league record. Second-year star Elton Brand led the team with 20.1 points, 10.1 rebounds and 1.6 blocks per game, while Mercer finished second on the team in scoring with 19.7 points per game, and Fizer was selected to the NBA All-Rookie Second Team. Following the season, Brand was traded to the Los Angeles Clippers. (See 2000–01 Chicago Bulls season#Regular season)

Offseason

NBA Draft

Roster

Regular season

The Bulls’ intentions going into the 2000-01 NBA season was to recruit a pair of the summer’s elite free agents—a group that included Tim Duncan, Grant Hill, Tracy McGrady and Eddie Jones—to be the core players in the re-building process. However, Duncan re-signed with San Antonio, Hill accommodated his wife’s desires to go to Orlando, and McGrady and Jones both opted to play near their home towns.

“It wasn't so much a rejection of Chicago,” Bulls owner Jerry Reinsdorf stated, “as it was other considerations that compelled these individuals to make the decisions that they made to play for the teams they chose to play with.”

Thus, the Bulls changed gears and focused on rebuilding through the draft and with youth. In the 2000 NBA Draft, the Bulls took some steps in that direction, selecting Marcus Fizer (4th overall), and acquiring Jamal Crawford (selected 8th overall by Cleveland and immediately traded to the Bulls). Other notable off-season acquisitions included the signing of free agents Ron Mercer (Aug. 2), and Brad Miller (Sept. 7).

Opening the season with the youngest roster in NBA history—an average of 22.9 years of age and seven rookies—isn’t typically a recipe for success in the league. The Bulls finished the season with the league's worst record at 15–67 in Head Coach Tim Floyd’s second full season. The team broke the franchise record for longest losing streak at the United Center with an eight-game stretch from Nov. 11 to Dec. 19 (previous record was six games), and set a new record for consecutive losses with 16 from Jan. 8 through Feb. 6 (previous record was 13 games in 1976). In addition, Chicago endured the longest road losing streak in franchise history, dropping 25 straight on the road from Dec. 21 through Apr. 10.

A bright spot in the 2000–01 Chicago Bulls season was starting 2–0 after the All Star break, with upset wins at home over the Atlanta Hawks on Tuesday, February 13, and the Miami Heat on Saturday, February 17, 2001.

The Bulls’ home sellout streak ended at 610 games on Nov. 3 vs. New Jersey, marking the third longest sellout streak in NBA history. Prior to that, the last time the Bulls failed to sell out a home game was Nov. 17, 1987, vs. Washington. Other news items from the season included second-year forward Elton Brand (sophomore team) and rookie guard Khalid El-Amin (rookie team) both participating in the Schick Rookie Challenge at All-Star Weekend, and Marcus Fizer being named to the NBA’s All-Rookie Second Team.

Standings

Record vs. opponents

Player statistics

Season

Awards and records
 Marcus Fizer, NBA All-Rookie Team 2nd Team

Transactions

See also
 2000–01 NBA season

References

External links
 
 
 

Chicago Bulls seasons
Chicago
Chicago